Biagio Puccini (1673–1721) was an Italian painter, active in his native Rome, but also in Tuscany, Umbria and the Marche in a late Baroque style.

He was born in Rome. He trained with Antonio Gherardi, but was influenced by Giacinto Brandi, Giuseppe Ghezzi, and Carlo Maratta.

References

17th-century Italian painters
Italian male painters
18th-century Italian painters
1673 births
1721 deaths
Italian Baroque painters
18th-century Italian male artists